Alexander Magnus Busch (born 25 July 2003) is a Danish professional footballer who plays as a centre-back for Danish Superliga club Silkeborg IF.

Career

Silkeborg IF
Busch joined Silkeborg IF in 2012 from Resenbro UIF at the age of 9. He signed his first three-year youth contract with the club in May 2020.

On 15 May 2021, Busch got his official debut for Silkeborg in the Danish 1st Division against HB Køge. He made a total of three appearances in that season, helping Silkeborg with promotion to the 2021-22 Danish Superliga. Busch was then promoted to the first team squad in the summer 2021. He made his Danish Superliga debut on 31 October 2021 against SønderjyskE. On 19 January 2022, Busch signed a new contract with Silkeborg until June 2026.

References

External links

2003 births
Living people
Danish men's footballers
Association football defenders
Danish 1st Division players
Danish Superliga players
Silkeborg IF players